The 1984 Daily Mirror Greyhound Derby took place during June with the final being held on 23 June 1984 at White City Stadium. It was the last time that White City held the event due to impending closure. The winner was Whisper Wishes and the winning owner John Duffy received £25,000. The competition was sponsored by the Daily Mirror.

Final result 
At White City (over 500 metres):

Distances 
½, head, ¾, head, 6¼ (lengths)
The distances between the greyhounds are in finishing order and shown in lengths. One length is equal to 0.08 of one second.

Competition Report
Thirty Irish entries were received for Derby including the Ger McKenna trained Morans Beef, Glenbrien Champ, Count Five, Back Garden and Lauragh Six. Ante-post favourite's were Game Ball now trained by Jerry Fisher and Whisper Wishes, eliminated from the competition at the second-round stage twelve months earlier.

The qualifying round ended with Glenbrien Champ and the Grace Peppercorn trained Ebony Tim winning well and the Irish won eight of the sixteen heats. One of the first round heats resulted in a one-two for McKenna as Lauragh Six beat Count Five with Game Ball scraping through in third. Best heat winner was another Irish entry Dipmac trained by Seamus Graham. Matt O’Donnell's Powersville Jet became the new favourite after recording a second round time of 29.24 just one length ahead of Proud Dodger, Game Ball tumbled out after failing to take third place from Lauragh Six.
 
The Irish made up half of the 24 runners left in the quarter-finals but Dipmac failed to progress from heat one and picked up a wrist injury. Heat two went to Whisper Wishes in 29.32 and the Irish had another bad result in the third heat when Powersville Jet and Count Five both went out after trouble along with Amazing Man a finalist from the previous year. The fourth and final heat was an Irish clean sweep, Proud Dodger won from Back Garden and Morans Beef.

The first semifinal saw Morans Beef win well and The Jolly Norman finished strongly to take second from the fading Spartacus with favourite Glenbrien Champ not making the final. The other semi went to Whisper Wishes recording a fourth straight win since his preliminary round defeat. The privately trained House of Hope came home second from Proud Dodger and both Lauragh Six and Geoff DeMulder's Nippy Law encountered trouble.

The final White City Derby went to Whisper Wishes trained by Charlie Coyle at (Maidstone) who led from the traps again and became a deserved winner holding off a persistent challenge from Moran's Beef and the late surge from Proud Dodger.

Quarter-finals

Semifinals

See also
1984 UK & Ireland Greyhound Racing Year

References

Greyhound Derby
English Greyhound Derby
English Greyhound Derby
English Greyhound Derby